The 2015–16 Florida Gators women's basketball team represented the University of Florida in the sport of basketball during the 2015–16 women's college basketball season.  The Gators competed in Division I of the National Collegiate Athletic Association (NCAA) and the Southeastern Conference (SEC).  They were led by ninth-year head coach Amanda Butler, and played their home games in the O'Connell Center on the university's Gainesville, Florida campus. They finished the season 22–9, 10–6 in SEC play to finish in a tie for fourth place. They lost in the quarterfinals of the SEC women's tournament to Kentucky. They received an at-large bid to the NCAA women's tournament where they were upset by Albany in the first round.

Previous season
The Gators finish the season 13–17, 5–11 in SEC play to finish in a tie for eleventh place. They lost in the first round of 2015 SEC women's basketball tournament to Auburn.

Roster

Coaches

Schedule and results

|-
!colspan=12 style="background:#0021A5; color:#FFFFFF;"| Non-conference regular season

|-
!colspan=12 style="background:#0021A5; color:#FFFFFF;"| SEC regular season

|-
!colspan=12 style="text-align: center; background:#0021A5"|SEC Women's Tournament

|-
!colspan=12 style="text-align: center; background:#0021A5"|NCAA Women's Tournament

Source:

Rankings
2015–16 NCAA Division I women's basketball rankings

See also
2015–16 Florida Gators men's basketball team

References

Florida Gators women's basketball seasons
Florida
Florida
Florida Gators
Florida Gators